Line Burquier (born 7 May 2003) is a French cyclist competing in cyclo-cross and cross-country mountain biking. At the 2021 UCI Mountain Bike World Championships, she won the gold medal with the French team in the cross-country relay and became world champion in the junior cross-country category. At the 2022 UCI Mountain Bike World Championships, she became world champion in the U23 cross-country.

Major results

Cyclo-cross

2019–2020
 1st  National Junior Championships
 Coupe de France
2nd La Meziere
 EKZ CrossTour
3rd Aigle
2020–2021
 1st  National Junior Championships
 2nd Troyes
2021–2022
 1st  National Championships
 Coupe de France
1st Pierric
1st Troyes
 2nd Jablines
 3rd Brumath
2022–2023
 1st Steinmaur
 2nd  UEC European Under-23 Championships

Mountain bike

2022
 UCI Junior Series
1st Alpe d'Huez
2021
 1st  Cross-country, UCI World Junior Championships
 1st  Cross-country, UEC European Junior Championships
 UCI Junior Series
1st Albstadt
1st Banyoles
2nd Haiming
 Junior French Cup
1st Ussel
 Junior Swiss Bike Cup
1st Leukerbad
2022
 1st  Cross-country, UCI World Under-23 Championships
 1st  Overall UCI XCO World Cup
1st Petrópolis
1st Albstadt
1st Nové Město
1st Vallnord
1st Val di Sole
2nd Leogang
2nd Lenzerheide
 French Cup
2nd Le Bessat
3rd Le Dévoluy
 Swiss Bike Cup
2nd Gränichen
 3rd Cross-country, National Championships

Road
2022
 3rd Road race, National Under-23 Road Championships

References

External links
 

2003 births
Living people
French female cyclists
French mountain bikers
Cross-country mountain bikers
Cyclo-cross cyclists
Sportspeople from Haute-Savoie
Cyclists from Auvergne-Rhône-Alpes
21st-century French women